Harry Greenway (born 4 October 1934) is a British Conservative politician and the former Member of Parliament for the Ealing North constituency.

Personal life and education
He was born on 4 October 1934, the son of John Kenneth Greenway and Violet Adelaide (née Bell). He married in 1969, Carol Elizabeth Helena, elder daughter of the late Major John Robert Thomas Hooper, barrister at law and Metropolitan Stipendiary Magistrate, and Dorinda Hooper (née de Courcy Ireland).

He has two daughters, Elizabeth and Eveline, and one son, Mark. He was educated at Warwick School and the College of St Mark & St John, known as 'Marjon', originally based in Chelsea, London, and now in Plymouth, Devon, as the University of St Mark & St John. Greenway also attended the University of Caen, Normandy.

He is a supporter of Aston Villa FC.

Career in education
During the 1960s he was a schoolteacher of English and sport, later becoming the head house master of Telford House at Sir William Collins Secondary School for boys (later mixed, and renamed South Camden Community School and then Regent High School), in Charrington Street, Somers Town, London, a large state comprehensive school of about 1,200 boys at the time. He introduced several new sports to the school, including horse riding and other equine activities, winter sports, and men's hockey. He later became deputy headmaster of Sedgehill Secondary School, a very large comprehensive school in south-east London with approximately 2,200 pupils, between 1972 and 1979.

Career in politics
He contested Stepney at the Parliamentary election in 1970 and Stepney and Poplar in the two elections of February and October 1974. He was elected MP for Ealing North at the 1979 general election. He defeated the Labour candidate for Ealing North, Hilary Benn in both the subsequent 1983 and 1987 general elections. Greenway finally lost the seat to Labour's Stephen Pound at the 1997 general election. Greenway was appointed an Honorary Freeman of the London Borough of Ealing on 19 February 2008.

In 1992, Greenway, as a member of the Commons, was prosecuted for the common law offence of bribery of a person holding a public office. The case collapsed because of insufficient evidence of a related trial involving the Plasser railway machinery company.

He was President of the Association of British Riding Schools (ABRS) for many years, until 2002. Greenway was interviewed in Michael Moore's TV Nation series (S1E9) about his views on caning in schools.

He is a former member of the council of the Open University, and in 2001 received an Honorary Doctorate from the university.

References

1934 births
Living people
Conservative Party (UK) MPs for English constituencies
People educated at Warwick School
UK MPs 1979–1983
UK MPs 1983–1987
UK MPs 1987–1992
UK MPs 1992–1997
Alumni of Plymouth Marjon University